Jamal Mohamed Barrow is a diplomat from Somalia. He was born in Golweyn, a village in lower Shabelle region, Somalia, on 1 July 1957. He has
married with a number of children.
He gained his first degree in Journalism in the Faculty of Journalism of the Somalia National
University in 1984 and he did his second degree in Business Administration in Moi University in
Nairobi, Kenya, in 2006. Barrow is the Ambassador of Somalia to Nigeria, based at the Somali embassy in Nigeria. In October 2019,
he was appointed as the new Somali Ambassador to the Federal Republic of Nigeria. He
became the first ambassador accredited to Nigeria since the collapse of the central
government of Somalia in 1991. Mr. Barrow was Somalia's Deputy Foreign Affairs minister between December 2012 and November, 2013.

Professionally, from 1995 to 2020, he held a number of positions which include

 Peace building and conflict resolution, and civic education trainer: In this sector, he
facilitated numerous sessions of workshops on peace building and conflict resolution,
leadership, gender & development, team building, community development and
mobilization, project management, entrepreneurship, fundraising, Participatory Rural
Appraisal (PRA), ToT, project evaluation and monitoring, strategic planning, board
management, human rights and democracy, networking, and customer services given to
various Somali Society organizations including, community elders, local authorities,
teachers, youth groups, parliament members, women groups like Coalition of Grass-root
Women organizations, SAACID Voluntary Organization, and CORD as well as other
NGOs/CBOs and networks

 Consultant management: In 2002, Ambassador Barrow established his own consultant
firm called Center for Training and Consultancy (CTC). The center’s focus was on
proving with consultant and training services to both governmental and nongovernmental institutions. From 2002 – 2011, CTC established working relationship
with a various international and local organizations including UN agencies

 In 2011, in response to a request from the then transitional government, Ambassador
Barrow developed a concept on establishing the NATIONAL Disaster Management
Authority and the idea had been accepted by the then President, Mr. Sharif Sheikh
Ahmed and his prime minister, Mr Abdiweli Ahmed Gas. Then, Ambassador Barrow
was mandated to translate the concept into workable organizational document. Then, the
disaster management authority was officially launched in the end of 2011. Ambassador
Barrow was appointed the deputy chair of the entity. Later, in 2017, the Disaster
Management Authority was promoted to ministerial level, becoming Ministry of
Humanitarian and Disaster Management of the Federal Republic of Somalia
 
 By mid of 2012, Ambassador Barrow shifted to politics and he became member of the
spearheading team of the presidential election campaign of Mr. Hassan Sheikh, who
succeeded in the presidential contest in the 2012. In October 2012, Mr. Hassan took
over the power from Mr. Sharif Sheikh Ahmed. In Hassan Sheikh’s government,
Ambassador Barrow was appointed as the deputy minister of the Foreign Affairs and he
was holding this position only for one year. In August 2014, President Hassan Sheikh
appointed Ambassador Barrow as his advisor on the parliament and cabinet affairs. In
April 2015, the cabinet approved that Ambassador Barrow to be the second ambassador
that government of Somalia sent to the Republic of South Africa and had been there for
four years. During the four year, Ambassador Barrow also was in charge seven other
countries in the southern Africa region as a non-resident ambassador. In October 2019,
he was appointed as the new Somali Ambassador to the Federal Republic of Nigeria. He
became the first ambassador accredited to Nigeria since the collapse of the central
government of Somalia in 1991.

Networking and Participation conference and seminars

Since 1995 Ambassador Jamal Mohamed Barrow became part of several international and
national networks in which he played significant roles. He had also participated in a number of
international forums and seminars.

References

External links
 Interview

Living people
Ambassadors of Somalia to South Africa
Somalian diplomats
Somali National University alumni
Moi University alumni
1957 births